Jleeb Al-Shuyoukh (Arabic: جليب الشيوخ Transliteration: Jalīb Al-Shuyūkh) is an area in Farwaniya Governorate, which is one of the six Governorates of Kuwait. It geographically divided into 5 blocks. It is located within the agglomeration of Kuwait City and is the closest area to Kuwait International Airport. It is largely inhabited by expatriates from  countries such as India, Pakistan, Bangladesh, Sri Lanka, Egypt & Syria. Jleeb Al-Shuyoukh is located at 29°16′N 47°56′E. Kuwaitis reside in Block 4. New neighbourhoods are coming up around the area. One such neighbourhood on west side of Jleeb is now designated as Abdullah Al Mubarak area (In Ministry records, it is also called as 'West Jleeb'). Its population in 2021 was 271,000.

Jleeb houses telecommunication exchange that serves communications needs of Airport and of Dajeej which is a major commercial centre in Farwaniya Governorate.

Blocks 

Jleeb Al-Shuyoukh is officially divided into 5 blocks. Every block has a mosque and there is a Jleeb Al-Shuyoukh Co-Op branch at Block 4.

Climate

Schools
A number of schools reside in various locations of Jleeb Al-Shuyoukh, majority of them are Indian Schools in Jleeb Al-Shuyoukh: 
 Indian Educational School, also known as Bharatiya Vidya Bhavan
 Indian Central School
 United Indian School Abbasiya
 Integrated Indian School Abbasiya
 Kuwait Indian School Abbasiya
 Al-Rashed Indian School
 Indian Learners Own Academy
 Smart Indian School
 Pakistan English School & College
 Nottingham British School
 United International Indian School
 Indian Central School

Transport
Jleeb Al-Shuyoukh has a large population that utilizes the public transport systems run by Kuwait Public Transport Company (KPTC), Citybus (a Boodai group subsidiary) and KGL Transportation. 

The area is flanked by major roads - Ghazali Expressway and the 6th Ring Road and is less than 5 km from the Kuwait International Airport. Taxis are widely available and one can expect to pre-bargain about the fares.

References

 Geography of Kuwait
 Districts of Al Farwaniyah Governorate